Liga Futebol Amadora Primeira Divisão (often referred to as the LFA Primeira Divisão) is the highest division of the Liga Futebol Amadora and the highest overall in the Timorense football league system.

The league is not fully professional.

History
The Liga Futebol Amadora Primera Divisão started from the 2016 season and replaced Super Liga Timorense as the top tier league in Timor Leste. Sport Laulara e Benfica become the first champions of the league.  In 2020 Lalenok United became the first team from the competition to represent Timor Leste in the AFC Cup after winning the competition in 2019.

Overview

Asian club competition eligibility
The champions of the league are eligible for represent Timor Leste in AFC Cup qualification round.

Relegation from Primeira Divisão
Up to two teams at the bottom of the league will face a direct relegation to Segunda Divisão.

Clubs participating in the 2022 season

The following 10 clubs are competing in the 2022 Liga Futebol Amadora Primera Divisão, expanded from 8 teams from the previous season.

Championship history

Most successful club

Awards

Top scorers

Best XI

References

External links
Official website

 
1
East Timor
Sports leagues established in 2015
2015 establishments in East Timor